Plan B is a 2009 Argentine comedy-drama film directed by Marco Berger.

Plot
Bruno (Manuel Vignau), after seeing his former girlfriend Laura (Mercedes Quinteros) happily together with a new boyfriend named Pablo (Lucas Ferraro), grows jealous and starts plotting to win her back with his friend Victor serving as a partner in crime and a sounding board for his plans. He initially plans to sleep with Laura behind Pablo's back and convince her to get back together with him but when that plan fails and he hears that Pablo has slept with another man in the past, he comes up with a "Plan B" of seducing Pablo and getting him to break up with Laura.

Bruno easily develops a friendship with Pablo, bonding with him over common interests and memories from their youth. He then starts to push the boundaries of their friendship, kissing Pablo on a dare from his friend Ana and then on a made-up excuse of needing practice for an acting role. His plan succeeds in getting Pablo to gradually fall for him, but it becomes apparent at the same time that his own feelings for Pablo have grown stronger than he planned for.

Eventually, Pablo learns about Bruno's plan and is heartbroken. He awkwardly tries to have sex with Bruno but then backs out of it and calls off their friendship. Despite now being free to resume his relationship with Laura, Bruno ultimately breaks up with her and confesses his love to Pablo. Pablo, in return, shows Bruno that he kept a photo of him in his lost wallet, implying that he was attracted to Bruno even before Bruno began his Plan B. The film ends with them kissing and heading off to the bedroom together.

Cast
Manuel Vignau as Bruno
Lucas Ferraro as Pablo
Mercedes Quinteros as Laura
Damián Canduci as Victor
Ana Lucia Antony as Ana
Carolina Stegmayer as Verónica
Antonia De Michelis as Madre Victor
Ariel Nuñez Di Croce as Javier
Khaled El nabawy as Adel Abdelaziz

Screenings
The film was an official selection at the Buenos Aires International Festival of Independent Cinema (BAFICI), at The Rome International Film Festival, BFI London Film Festival, and films festivals in Havana, Palm Springs, Bilbao, Toulouse, Amsterdam and Melbourne.

References

External links
 

2009 films
2009 comedy-drama films
2009 LGBT-related films
Argentine comedy-drama films
Argentine LGBT-related films
Films directed by Marco Berger
LGBT-related comedy-drama films
2000s Spanish-language films
2000s Argentine films